Beautiful Creatures is a 2013 American romantic gothic fantasy film written for the screen and directed by Richard LaGravenese based on the 2009 novel of the same name by Kami Garcia and Margaret Stohl. It stars Alden Ehrenreich, Alice Englert, Jeremy Irons, Viola Davis, Emmy Rossum, Thomas Mann, and Emma Thompson.

It was released in the United States on February 14, 2013, by Warner Bros. Pictures. It received mixed reviews from critics and grossed $60.1 million worldwide against its $60 million budget, making it a box office bomb.

Plot
In Gatlin, South Carolina, teenager Ethan Wate awakens from a recurring dream of a girl he has not met. He despairs of his small-town existence and dreams of leaving for college. His first day of junior year, a newcomer Lena Duchannes resembles the girl Ethan has been dreaming about. Other students gossip about Lena's reclusive uncle, Macon Ravenwood, suggesting her family are devil worshippers. On the way home, Ethan nearly runs her over. Giving her a ride, they bond over interests.

In class, a few students insist they can not be in class with Lena, and pray to be protected from her and her family. Visibly shaken, her class windows shatter, increasing fears and suspicions she is a witch. Ethan and Lena become friends and he gives her a locket he found at Greenbriar. Both touching the locket triggers a shared flashback to the Civil War.

Macon, disapproving of their relationship, conspires with Ethan's family friend, Amma, to separate them. Lena tells Ethan that she and her family are "casters" capable of performing spells. On her sixteenth birthday, her true nature will reveal itself toward either the light or dark.

Complications arise when two powerful dark casters aim to push Lena to the dark: Ridley, Lena's cousin, and Lena's mother, Sarafine, who did not raise Lena and has possessed Mrs. Lincoln, the mother of Ethan's friend Link.

Sarafine foresees Lena will become a powerful caster, wanting Lena to use her power to purge the Earth of humans, leaving just casters. The couple have another flashback of their past with the locket, revealing that their ancestors, caster Genevieve Duchannes and mortal Confederate soldier Ethan Carter Wate, were in love. Ethan died in battle, and Genevieve revived him. Doing so laid a curse on all Duchannes women; they will go dark on their sixteenth birthday. A mortified Lena asks Amma to help, being a seer and keeper of the caster library beneath the town library, extending all across the USA. The most ancient of the books reveals the secret to undoing the curse: someone Lena loves has to die. Unwilling to take Ethan's life, Lena erases his memories of their love.

Seducing Link, Ridley gives him a bullet to use in the upcoming Civil War reenactment of the Battle of Honey Hill, also Lena's sixteenth birthday, Lena feels the shock of the curse being broken and runs to Ethan, clutching his dying body as Ridley and Sarafine encourage her to accept the dark. She lashes out in anger, sending a huge tornado through the crowd, until Ethan's body transforms into Macon, who had disguised himself to be the sacrifice to lift the curse. As he is dying, he reveals that he promised Ethan's mother to keep her son alive. These dying words encourage Lena to "claim [her]self"; she causes the moon to disappear so it cannot claim her for the dark. Allowing Ridley to flee, she pulls Sarafine from Mrs. Lincoln's body, powerfully sealing away Sarafine's spirit.

Six months later, a still-amnesiac Ethan visits Amma in the library before a college tour with Link. Lena gives him a book they had once shared as a present. Lena is a half light/dark caster. As Link and Ethan reach the town line, the town's burned exit sign reminds him momentarily, he gets out of the car, shouting Lena. She hears his call.

Cast

 Alden Ehrenreich as Ethan Wate
 Alice Englert as Lena Duchannes
 Jeremy Irons as Macon Melchizedek Ravenwood
 Viola Davis as Amarie Treadeau, "Amma"
 Emmy Rossum as Ridley Duchannes
 Thomas Mann as Wesley Jefferson Lincoln, "Link"
 Emma Thompson as Mavis Lincoln/Sarafine Duchannes
 Margo Martindale as Delphine Duchannes, "Aunt Del"
 Eileen Atkins as Emmaline Duchannes, "Gramma" 
 Zoey Deutch as Emily Asher
 Tiffany Boone as Savannah Snow
 Kyle Gallner as Larkin Kent
 Rachel Brosnahan as Genevieve Katherine Duchannes
 Pruitt Taylor Vince as Mr. Lee
 Robin Skye as Mrs. Hester
 Randy Redd as Reverend Stephens
 Lance E. Nichols as Mayor Snow
 Leslie Castay as Principal Herbert
 Sam Gilroy as Ethan Carter Wate
 Gwendolyn Mulamba as Mrs. Snow
 Cindy Hogan as Mrs. Asher

Production
Alcon Entertainment purchased the rights to Beautiful Creatures in 2009, with director Richard LaGravenese signing on soon after to write and direct the movie. Casting began in late 2011, and in February 2012, Viola Davis was cast as Amma. Soon after, Jack O'Connell and Alice Englert were announced to play the lead characters of Ethan Wate and Lena Duchannes. O'Connell later dropped out due to a scheduling conflict, with Alden Ehrenreich assuming the role of Ethan. Further casting included Emma Thompson as Sarafine and Mrs. Lincoln and Jeremy Irons as Lena's uncle Macon Ravenwood. Of the character of Lena, Englert stated that "Lena is like most girls when you feel massively insecure".

Principal photography was originally scheduled to begin 23 April 2012 in New Orleans, and took place, said LaGravenese, beginning "I think, April 16th, and then we shot until June 26th, and then post[-production] was for me from July 5th to December 17th." LaGravenese chose to incorporate practical special effects along with computer-based ones for certain scenes, as Emmy Rossum described: "[W]hen we walked on to the stage and realized the chandelier does actually move, the chairs did actually spin, the table did actually spin... it was all very exciting." On 19 September 2012, the first trailer for Beautiful Creatures was released.

Camille Balsamo played Genevieve Katherine Duchannes in a sequence cut from the film; LaGravenese said:

The original soundtrack was composed by thenewno2 and released by WaterTower Music. Its musical style was referred to as "swamptronic", a term coined by LaGravenese, and it was recorded at Abbey Road. Dhanni Harrison, son of George Harrison, used some of his father's guitars and equipment in recording the soundtrack.

Distribution

Release
Beautiful Creatures''' release date was originally scheduled to be on 13 February 2013, but distributor Warner Bros. later pushed the date to Thursday, 24 February 2013. The film was still released in Sweden on the 13th, a day before the film's North American release date. The film held its official US premiere on 11 February 2013, in New York City.

Home mediaBeautiful Creatures was released on DVD and Blu-ray Disc on 21 May 2013. In its first month in release, the film sold around 428,792 copies in both DVD and Blu-ray formats combined, bringing in a consumer revenue of $7,377,859. As of 16 June 2013, the film has grossed an estimated $10,337,826 in DVD and Blu-ray sales.

Reception

Box office
The film grossed $10,124,912 during its opening weekend, including its Thursday release date, under-performing based on media expectations.

While the film was considered to be a flop domestically, only grossing $19,452,138 by the end of its North American domestic theatrical run (against a $60 million production budget) it did better internationally, where it has grossed $40,600,000. As of 21 April 2013, the film grossed a worldwide total of $60,052,138, making it a financial loss.  It failed to recoup its production budget and other costs, as generally speaking, half of ticket sales proceeds go to theaters. Variety magazine listed Beautiful Creatures as one of "Hollywood's biggest box office bombs of 2013".

Critical response
The film has received mixed reviews from critics. It has a 47% rating on review aggregation website Rotten Tomatoes, based on 169 reviews, with the site's consensus stating: "Charming romantic leads and esteemed supporting cast aside, Beautiful Creatures is a plodding YA novel adaptation that feels watered down for the Twilight set". 
On Metacritic, the film received a score of 52% based on 40 reviews, indicating mixed or average reviews.

Owen Gleiberman, in Entertainment Weekly, gave the film a "B−", writing, "Beautiful Creatures is arriving in a market-place full of Twilight junkies still eager for their supernatural teen-romantic fix, and the film's concept couldn't be clearer: It's Twilight with the sexes reversed. This time it's the boy who's the mortal: moody, bookish Ethan, the outsider in his sleepy small town." Gleiberman added that though the film "is lushly pictorial and not-too-badly acted... the audience, like Ethan, spends way too much time waiting around for Lena to learn whether she's a good girl or a bad girl."

The film review website ScreenRant called the film "a choppy and melodramatic experience with very little payoff beyond the central love story. Worse yet, overlooking the usual on-the-nose dialogue about eternal love and sacrifice, this tale of star-crossed sweethearts is especially cheesy and unconvincing – even when compared to similarly heavy-handed young adult novel-turned-movies. Fans of the supernatural romance subgenre will get about what they expect..."

David Denby of The New Yorker wrote that the movie "is a classic example of the confusions and the outright blunders that can overtake talented people who commit themselves to a concept driven purely by the movie marketplace... Alas, the satirical energy and Ethan's bright talk dissipate after a while." He praises a scene from the Civil War flashback which "appears as Ethan and Lena are watching a movie in a local theatre, but only they can see it" as "an interesting idea that I wish LaGravenese had pursued as a parallel narrative. This kind of movie, however, demands not interesting ideas but whooshing spectacle and madly redundant climaxes and a soundtrack filled with thuds and a shouting female chorus."

Scott Mendelson of Forbes magazine called the film "shockingly good" and encouraged viewers who missed it to check it out on video.

CinemaScore audience polls gave the film a B grade.Beautiful Creatures was featured on episode 187 of the comedy podcast How Did This Get Made?''.

Accolades

Canceled sequels
Warner Bros. and Alcon Entertainment initially purchased the film rights to all four novels in the Caster Chronicles series, with this film being based on the first book. Tentative plans for the next three books to be adapted into films were abandoned following this film's failure at the box office.

References

External links

 
 
 
 
 

2013 films
2010s romantic fantasy films
2010s teen romance films
Alcon Entertainment films
American romantic fantasy films
American teen romance films
Films based on American novels
Films directed by Richard LaGravenese
Films set in South Carolina
Films shot in New Orleans
Southern Gothic films
Summit Entertainment films
2010s teen fantasy films
Warner Bros. films
Films about witchcraft
Films produced by David Valdes
2010s English-language films
2010s American films